The Funerary Complex of Amir Taghribirdi or Mosque and Madrasa of Taghribirdi (Arabic: مسجد و مدرسة تغري بردي) is a historical funerary complex of a mosque and madrasa located in Cairo, Egypt and built in the year 1440, during the Mamluk Sultanate. This monument honors Amir Taghribirdi, the mosque's commissioner and the secretary to Sultan al-Zahir Jaqmaq. The mosque and madrasa of Taghribirdi is located on a corner of Saliba street. This is not to be confused with a different Mosque of Taghribirdi, which is located in the Darb al-Maqasis neighborhood of Cairo.

Amir Taghribirdi 
The monument was founded in 1440 during the reign of Sultan al-Zahir Jaqmaq by Amir Taghribirdi. Amir Taghribirdi is not to be confused with his son, the famed Islamic scholar Ibn Taghribirdi. Purportedly a man of somber disposition, Amir Taghribirdi rose to prominence as a respected amir under Sultan Barsbay for his role in leading the Mamluk army against the Crusader Kingdom of Cyprus. For this achievement he was elevated to grand dawadar, or executive secretary, under Sultan al-Zahir Jaqmaq. However, Taghribirdi was murdered by his own mamluks shortly thereafter.

Overview 

The Mosque of Taghribirdi itself is at once a mosque, a madrasa, and a Sufi convent, representing the style of compact architecture popular in the late Mamluk period. Carved into the foundation of the mosque are two inscriptions, dating the building to Jumada I and Jumada II 844 of the Islamic calendar, or October and November 1440.

Architecture and design 

Situated on a street corner, the mosque has two facades. The main entrance is found on Sharia Saliba and features typical Mamluk architectural ornamentation, namely ablaq and marble accents. To the left of the elevated portal is a sabil, where a reconstructed kuttab was completed by Comité in 1911.  The minaret, located behind the sabil, has a square base, a stylistic element characteristic of the early 15th century. To the right, the monument encompasses a tomb facade and a small dome, which is constructed from brick and decorated with a lozenge-like pattern made of stucco. The side street facing the mosque's second facade has a view of a large round window over the mihrab of the mosque. The sahn remains open and covered by an awning and wire mesh, an inscription is carved around it.  Wooden ceilings decorate the qibla and lateral iwans, while the interior is circled with an inlaid marble dado.

Orientation 
A birds-eye view of the mosque reveals its unique architectural feats. Because of its location at the corner of two streets, the mosque had to be set at an angle of almost 45 degrees in order to maintain a qibla orientation towards Mecca. Despite the difficulties this presented, the mosque includes a near-perfect symmetrical arrangement with symmetrical windows and space on the qibla wall for the mausoleum. The extra wall space caused by this orientation has not been filled in with masonry, but rather turned into small cubed spaces used for light and air shafts, a unique feature of this particular building.

See also

 Lists of mosques
 List of mosques in Africa
 List of mosques in Egypt
 List of Historic Monuments in Cairo

References 

15th-century mosques
Mamluk architecture in Egypt
Mosque buildings with domes
15th-century establishments in the Mamluk Sultanate
Mosques in Cairo
Mosques completed in the 1440s